"Almost Maybes" is a song co-written and recorded by American country pop singer Jordan Davis. It was released in May 2020 as the lead single from Davis' eponymous EP.

Content
Jordan Davis wrote "Almost Maybes" with Hillary Lindsey and Jesse Frasure, and it was produced by Paul DiGiovanni. Lyrically, Davis said the song was inspired by past relationships that didn't work out that lead you to the one you're supposed to be with: "I love the message of it. I think everybody can relate to those people in your life that, it might not have been the right one, and it sucked at the time when you're going through it, but it just gets you one step closer to the person you're gonna be with." The song has been compared to a modern take on Garth Brooks' song "Unanswered Prayers".

Charts

Weekly charts

Year-end charts

Certifications and sales

References

2020 songs
2020 singles
Jordan Davis (singer) songs
Songs written by Jordan Davis (singer)
Songs written by Jesse Frasure
Songs written by Hillary Lindsey
MCA Nashville Records singles